Yasugawa Dam is a gravity dam located in Shiga prefecture in Japan. The dam is used for irrigation. The catchment area of the dam is  km2. The dam impounds about 50  ha of land when full and can store 8500 thousand cubic meters of water. The construction of the dam was completed in 1951.

References

Dams in Shiga Prefecture
1951 establishments in Japan